The second season of Mad TV, an American sketch comedy series, originally aired in the United States on the Fox Network between September 21, 1996, and May 17, 1997. The season had 22 episodes, and featured many of the same cast members as Season 1 had.

Season summary
The second season of Mad TV was not a radical departure from season one (largely the same cast, the same humor, and the same format), though there were some minor cast changes. Tim Conlon and Pablo Francisco joined as featured players while Artie Lange was fired midway through the season for his erratic behind-the-scenes behavior due to cocaine abuse.

The addition of a weekly guest host was the most notable difference of season two, the only season of Mad TV to feature one. Although every season has had several guest stars, season two's guest stars were referred to as "hosts" and appeared in nearly every sketch. Every episode had a new host, where as in other seasons, not every episode had a guest star and the guest star usually only appeared in a few sketches. The guest host format was similar to their main rival Saturday Night Live'''s, but Mad TV ended this format after season two (though later seasons would have special guest stars who appeared in sketches or did monologues).

This is the second and last season to air new Spy vs Spy and Don Martin animation before they added reruns to make up for not creating any new episodes.

Opening montage
The title sequence for season two is exactly the same as the previous season, except the theme song features more bass.  The sequence starts with several fingers pointing at a bomb. The bomb explodes and several different pictures of Alfred E. Neuman appear, followed by the Mad TV logo. The theme song, which is performed by the hip-hop group Heavy D & the Boyz, begins. Cast members are introduced alphabetically with their names appearing in caption over live-action clips of them. More pictures of Alfred E. Neuman appear between the introduction of each cast member. When the last cast member is introduced, the music stops and the title sequence ends with the phrase "You are now watching Mad TV."

Cast

Repertory cast members
 Bryan Callen  (22/22 episodes) 
 David Herman  (22/22 episodes) 
 Orlando Jones  (22/22 episodes) 
 Phil LaMarr  (22/22 episodes) 
 Artie Lange  (10/22 episodes; last episode: January 4, 1997)
 Mary Scheer  (22/22 episodes) 
 Nicole Sullivan  (22/22 episodes) 
 Debra Wilson  (21/22 episodes) 

Featured cast members
 Craig Anton (1/19 episodes)
 Tim Conlon (3/19 episodes)
 Pablo Francisco (4/19 episodes)

Writers

Fax Bahr (eps. 1-22)
Stuart Blumberg (eps. 1-14)
Garry Campbell (eps. 1-22)
Blaine Capatch (eps. 1-22)
Leonard Dick (eps. 3, 6)
Lauren Dombrowski (eps. 1-22)
Chris Finn (eps. 1-22)
Spencer Green (eps. 1-22)
Brian Hartt (writing supervisor) (eps. 1-22)
Steve Hibbert (ep. 15)
Tim Hightower (eps. 1-22)
Brad Kaaya (eps. 1-22)
Patton Oswalt (eps. 1-22)
Mary Scheer (ep. 5)
Michael Short (creative consultant) (eps. 1-22)
Adam Small (eps. 1-22)
Mary Elizabeth Williams (eps. 1-22)

Episodes

Home releases
Despite a preview on the special features disc of the Mad TV: the Complete First Season DVD box set, season two of Mad TV'' was not initially released on DVD due to poor sales of season one. Shout Factory finally released the complete second season on March 26, 2013.

On the HBO Max release, episodes 2, 3, 9, 14, 21 and 22 are missing. Episodes 21 and 22 show up as best of episodes.

External links
 Mad TV - Official Website
 
 Jump The Shark - Mad TV

02
1996 American television seasons
1997 American television seasons